Cards of Grief is a novel by Jane Yolen published in 1984.

Plot summary
Cards of Grief is a novel in which an Earth anthropologist falls in love with a native from a world where grieving is nearly an artform.

Reception
Dave Langford reviewed Cards of Grief for White Dwarf #86, and stated that "the secrets and plot turns are merely sad, and Yolen's low, moaning narrative tone makes this not a punch book but a memorable one."

Reviews
Review by Veronica M. S. Kennedy (1985) in Fantasy Review, June 1985
Review by Tom Easton (1985) in Analog Science Fiction/Science Fact, July 1985
Review by Ken Brown (1987) in Interzone, #20 Summer 1987

References

1984 American novels